The Democratic Action Party (PAD) was a Spanish political party of social democratic ideology.

It was founded by former justice minister Francisco Fernández Ordóñez in November 1981 and was formed by 17 parliamentarians—10 deputies and 7 senators—that had left the Union of the Democratic Centre (UCD) due to its conservative political positions. The PAD reached an electoral agreement with the Spanish Socialist Workers' Party (PSOE) ahead of the 1982 Spanish general election. The party was dissolved in 1983 and the majority of its members joined the PSOE.

References

Defunct political parties in Spain
Political parties established in 1982
Political parties disestablished in 1983
1982 establishments in Spain
1983 disestablishments in Spain